Archaeopsittacus is a genus of prehistoric parrot. It is known from deposits of either Late Oligocene or Early Miocene age (c. 23 mya) at Verreaux near Saint-Gérand-le-Puy, France. A single species, Archaeopsittacus verreauxi,
is known.

The genus was apparently close to the Old World lineages of parrots and might conceivably be assigned to the modern subfamily Psittacinae - either in the strict sense (i.e. including the African parrots and possibly the Asian parrots and parakeets) or in the loose sense (including all psittaciformes except some or all of lories and lorikeets, cockatoos, Nestorinae, kakapo and Arini), despite its early age. Its lack of apomorphies prevents any better placement until more material is found.

Footnotes

References
 Lambrecht, Kálmán (1933): [Genus Archaeopsittacus] In: Handbuch der Palaeornithologie: 609. Gebrüder Bornträger, Berlin.
 Mayr, Gerald & Göhlich, Ursula B. (2004): A new parrot from the Miocene of Germany, with comments on the variation of hypotarsus morphology in some Psittaciformes. Belgian Journal of Zoology 134(1): 47–54. PDF fulltext
 Milne-Edwards, Alphonse (1870): Observations sur la faune ornithologique du Bourbonnais pendant la période tertiaire moyenne. C. R. hebd. Acad. sci. 70(11): 557–559. Fulltext at Gallica
 Waterhouse, David M. (2006): Parrots in a nutshell: The fossil record of Psittaciformes (Aves). Historical Biology 18(2): 227–238, 

Bird genera
Parrots
Paleogene birds of Europe
Psittacidae
Psittacinae
Fossil taxa described in 1870
Neogene birds of Europe
Taxa named by Kálmán Lambrecht